The following highways are numbered 933:

Costa Rica
 National Route 933

Ireland
 R933 regional road

United States